Beachhead Solutions is an IT security company and creator of the SimplySecure Management System, a web-based management tool designed to remotely secure vulnerable mobile devices within organizations, including those devices owned by employees. Beachhead's services are targeted at individual businesses and the reseller channel via managed service providers (MSPs). The technology manages security on Mac & Windows PCs, USB storage, iPhones, iPads and Android devices by imposing access restrictions that can include data wiping, revocation of authentication, denial (and restoration) of data access, and system shutdown.

The company is privately held and funded.

History

Beachhead’s first CTO, Dave Rensin, developed the company’s core technology for creating data protection systems in cases of hardware loss while a consultant for the United States Army in 2002, where he was tasked with finding novel ways of securing sensitive military data on lost PDAs and other devices. A year later, Rensin teamed with a group of Silicon Valley veterans (including Jim Obot, Jeff Rubin and Tim Lavelle) in forming Beachhead Solutions to bring the technology to a commercial audience. In 2008 and 2009, Beachhead obtained three United States patents for the company's system and method for lost data destruction of electronic data stored on portable electronic devices.

See also
Mobile Device Management
AirWatch

References

Software companies established in 2003
Companies based in San Jose, California
2003 establishments in California